Union Brewery may refer to:
 Union Brewery (Adelaide), an early establishment in South Australia
 Union Brewery (Iowa), a historic brewery building in Iowa City, Iowa, United States
 Union Brewery (Slovenia), one of the largest breweries in Slovenia
 Dortmund U-Tower, a former brewery building in Dortmund, Germany
 Yakel House and Union Brewery, a historic house and brewery complex in Alton, Illinois, United States